Ladyhawk is a Canadian indie rock band based in Vancouver, British Columbia.  The band released three albums and an EP, and toured across Canada several times.

History
Ladyhawk formed in February 2004 in Vancouver. Their debut album, Ladyhawk was released on June 6, 2006 on Jagjaguwar Records. The lead single on the album was "Dugout", followed by "My Old Jacknife". Their next album Shots , was recorded in an old barn in their hometown of Kelowna, and released in 2008. During the making of Shots, a documentary was filmed about the Ladyhawks, called "Let Me Be Fictional".

The songs "Drunk Eyes" and "The Dugout" (from Ladyhawk) can be heard in the 2009 film The Thaw.

In 2012 the band released the album No Can Do, and then went on a promotional tour around Canada. to promote it. Soon after, the band went on hiatus, but reformed in 2014.

Members
Duffy Driediger – guitar, vocals
Darcy Hancock – guitar, vocals
Sean Hawryluk – bass
Ryan Peters – drums

Discography

Ladyhawk
Ladyhawk (Jagjaguwar, 2006)
Fight for Anarchy EP (Jagjaguwar, 2007)
Shots (Jagjaguwar, 2008)
No Can Do (Triple Crown Audio, 2012)

Side projects
Drumheller - Sports (Triple Crown Audio, 2009)
Scriptural Supplies - Duffy and The Doubters (Triple Crown Audio, 2010)
Baptists - Baptists (Southern Lord Records, 2011)

See also

Music of Canada
Music of Vancouver
Canadian rock
List of Canadian musicians
List of bands from Canada
List of bands from British Columbia
:Category:Canadian musical groups

References

External links
Official website
MySpace Page
Blog
Jagjaguwar Artist Page
Let Me Be Fictional - Ladyhawk Documentary
2008 Ladyhawk Interview at Bandega.com
Article
The Red Alert article
Ladyhawk interview
Triple Crown Audio Recordings

Musical groups established in 2004
Canadian indie rock groups
Musical groups from Vancouver
2004 establishments in British Columbia
Jagjaguwar artists